Shikohabad is a city and a municipal board in the Firozabad district of the Indian state of Uttar Pradesh.

Bateshwar, a famous Hindu pilgrimage centre dedicated to Shiva, and also a famous Jain Tirth on the banks of River Yamuna, is situated 22 kilometres south of Shikohabad..

Geography
The rivers Sirsa. Sirsa flows between the main city and pass out the railway station.

History
The old name of Shikohabad was Mohammad Mah (the name still exists as Mohmmad mah near Tahsil and Kotwali). Shikohabad is named after Dara Shikoh, the eldest brother of Emperor Aurangzeb. In its present form, the town has hardly any recognisable evidence of that era. Shikohabad was ruled under the estate of Labhowa from 1794 to 1880. According to British historian Matthew Atmore Sherring Phatak Ahirs alone have 21 villages in Shikohabad.

Accessibility
Shikohabad is well connected with other cities by roadways as well as railways. This city is connects with cities like Agra, Firozabad, Mathura, New Delhi, Noida, Etawah, Kanpur, Allahabad, Varanasi, Patna, Kolkata by National Highway 19 (formerly known as NH-2) and it also connects through Agra Lucknow Expressway through which is connected to Agra, Lucknow, Kanpur Mainpuri, Etawah. Shikohabad Railway Station is located on Delhi Mugalsarai main line of North Central Railway having direct connection to Delhi, Kolkata, Mumbai, Agra, Etawah, Kanpur, Jaipur, Lucknow, Mainpuri and Farrukhabad. It is also well connected by road with all major cities of the state and region. It is further connected to Etah via SH-85 and to Mainpuri via SH-84.

Demographics
As per provisional data of 2011 census, Shikohabad had a population of 107,300, out of which males were 50,107 and females were 50,283. The literacy rate was 81.68 per cent.

References

External links 
Shikohabad Population Census 2011–2022

Cities and towns in Firozabad district
Cities in Uttar Pradesh
Shikohabad